The “Foundation for Justice” is a nonprofitable organisation that works in the field of Human Rights through an involvement in three main areas: awareness raising, training and development cooperation.

The goal is to cause change in attitudes and behaviour in society by assessing the current situation of justice and promoting values such as peace, democracy and solidarity in Spain, Africa, Asia and Latin America.

Areas of work 
 Assessing the current situation of justice: reports are made on justice and human rights in Spain and Latin America.
 Training: courses and seminars are offered in subjects related to law, especially in human rights aimed at professionals, students and members of NGOs.
 Awareness raising: society is made aware of the importance of respect for human rights. The foundation organises, participates and collaborates in campaigns and cultural events such as photograph exhibitions and charity sport competitions.

Activities in the Awareness Raising Area are:
 Internacional Film Festival on Peace and Human Rights,
 The Foundation for Justice organises every year an International Film Festival on Peace and Human Rights with the aim of making accessible to the citizens of the Valencian Community filming which is thought provoking and committed,
 Prize “Foundation for Justice” - the award is given to acknowledge dedication in the field of justice and human rights. The candidates to be awarded can be individuals or institutions who have contributed to the idea of justice.

Development cooperation:
The Foundation for Justice designs and manages development cooperation projects in the areas of training, defence and respect to human rights in collaboration with local partners.

Ethiopia
 Project to reduce harming traditional practices on women with the local group Ethiopian Women Lawyers Association.
Bangladesh
 Projects on microcredits with Professor Mohamed Yunus and the Grameen Bank (Peace Nobel Prize 2006)

External links 
 Web de la Fundación por la Justicia 

International human rights organizations